The Anglo Saxon Clubs of America was a white supremacist political organization which was active in the United States in the 1920s, and lobbied in favor of anti-miscegenation laws and against immigration from outside of Northern Europe. Founded in Richmond, Virginia, in 1922 by musician and composer John Powell and explorer Earnest Sevier Cox, the organization had 400 members in 1923 and 32 "posts" by 1925 and was open only to white male members. The organization was successful in lobbying for tougher legislation, and is credited with having secured the passing of the Racial Integrity Act of 1924. The organization has been described as "an elitist version of the Ku Klux Klan".

References

Anti-Asian sentiment in the United States
Anti-black racism in the United States
Anti-Irish sentiment
Antisemitism in Virginia
Anti-Slavic sentiment
Anti-Polish sentiment
English-American culture in Virginia
Political organizations based in the United States
Organizations established in 1922
Richmond, Virginia
White supremacist groups in the United States